The Jutland Dragoon Regiment is the only regiment of the Royal Danish Army that has an armored (MBT) battalion, and is one of the Danish combat regiments in which soldiers are entitled to wear the black beret of the Armoured corps.

History
The Regiment traces its roots back to the 3rd Dragoon Regiment formed in 1657, but did not become the Jutland Dragoon Regiment until 1932, with the amalgamation of the 3rd Dragoon Regiment in Århus and the 5th Dragoon regiment in Randers. The regimental fusion eventually necessitated a relocation to Holstebro in 1953, where the Dragoons have remained ever since.

The Regiment acquired international fame in recent time, when it served with UNPROFOR in Bosnia, where the Dragoons of Jutland assaulted Serb AT-3 Sagger positions in one of the largest skirmishes between UNPROFOR forces and military units involved in the war in Bosnia, and the largest Danish battle engagement since The Second Schleswig War of 1864. The battle, known as Operation Bøllebank, was later characterized by the commander at the time as the time when "the mouse ate the cat".

On 19 July 2005 another traditional regiment, Prinsens Livregiment was merged with Jydske Dragonregiment, and personnel serving as Dragoons became entitled to bear the insignia of the Royal Danish Prince Consort, Henrik, Prince Consort of Denmark

From the 1960s to 2004 the regiment had responsibility for three armoured battalions, one reconnaissance battalion and three motorized infantry battalions. The three armoured battalions were assigned to different brigades, the recce battalion and later (1992) one armoured battalion as independent battalions in Danish Division. From 1992−2004 the regiment also had to form three light reconnaissance squadrons assigned to three of the five brigades. With the three infantry battalions and regimental staff, in war time, the regiment could form a battlegroup, with combat support/artillery troops from other regiments.

The regiment has in recent time served on the frontline in Danish involvements in Yugoslavia, Kosovo, Afghanistan and Iraq.

The regiment's tank battalion won the Top 120mm Fire Team category at the Ex Worthington 16 competition in 2016, held at CFB Gagetown in Canada.

The Regimental logo is inspired by the coat of arms of Denmark, and features a blue lion above nine red hearts, and the monogram C5, in reference to King Christian V who ordered the formation of the original 3rd Dragoon Regiment. The lion and its red hearts are also a symbol of Jutland and are featured on the stern of Fregatten Jylland.

Structure
The regiment today serves only in its armoured role as well as in an educational role for new conscripts, in a separate battalion.
Units
  I Armoured Battalion I/JDR (1953−present)
 Staff Squadron (inactive)
  1st Tank Squadron (Niels Kjeldsen Squadron)
  2nd Tank Squadron 
  3rd Tank Squadron (Lilje Squadron)
  II Armored Infantry Battalion II/JDR (2011−present). Motor Battalion (1953−1955), Armoured Battalion (1955–2004), Training Battalion (2004−2011)
 Staff Company
  1st Mechanised Infantry Company (Viking Company)
  2nd Mechanised Infantry Company (Livkompagniet) (inactive)
  4th Armored Infantry Company (4 of Diamonds Company)
  V Training Battalion V/JDR (2011−present). Reconnaissance Battalion 1974−2004, disbanded 2005-2011.
 1st Basic Training Squadron
 2nd Basic Training Squadron
 3rd Mechanised Infantry Company ("Bulldog" Squadron) 
Disbanded Units
  III/JDR Armoured Battalion (1961−1984, 1988-2005), Armoured Infantry Battalion (1984-1987)
  IV/JDR Reconnaissance Battalion (1961−1968), Infantry Battalion (1968-2005), also as Training Battalion in mid '80s
  VI/JDR Tank Destroyer Battalion (1986-1994), Infantry Battalion (2000-2005), merged in from Queen's Life Regiment, only as reserve
  VII/JDR Infantry Battalion (1992−2005), merged in from King's Jutlandic Regiment of Foot, only as reserve
  Prince's Music Corps, (2005-2020), originally from Prince's Life Regiment

Names of the regiment

See also
 Guard Hussar Regiment
 Royal Life Guards
 Schleswig Regiment of Foot

References

External links
 Official website

Danish Army regiments
Cavalry regiments of Denmark
Dragoons
Military units and formations established in 1932
Military units and formations of the Bosnian War